Puffin Rock is a children's television series. Based on Puffin Island, situated off the Irish coast, the series follows a young puffin named Oona and her little brother Baba as they explore their world. The program is narrated by Chris O'Dowd. The series premiered on 12 January 2015. It is co-produced by American company Penguin Random House, British company Dog Ears and Irish company Cartoon Saloon.

It originally aired on RTÉjr in Ireland, Nick Jr., Nick Jr. Too and Milkshake! in the United Kingdom, Nick Jr. in Italy, ABC Kids in Australia,ERT2 in Greece and Netflix in Ireland, the United States, Canada, Latin America, Spain, the Benelux countries, UK, Poland, France, Denmark and Germany.

Characters
Oona (voiced by Kate McCafferty) - A female Atlantic Puffin and the protagonist of the series. She is preschool-aged and treats every day as a new opportunity.
Baba (voiced by Sally McDaid) - Oona's younger brother. He is easily distracted and can be slightly clumsy at times. Baba says "Ba ba boooo!" at the end of the theme song.
Mama Puffin (voiced by Geraldine Cole) - Oona and Baba's mother.
Papa Puffin (voiced by Brian McMonagle) - Oona and Baba's father.
Mossy (voiced by Darragh Gargan) - Oona's best friend, a brown Eurasian Pygmy Shrew. He lives in a tree stump on the island and is usually focused on food.
May (voiced by Anna McDaid) - An energetic rabbit who lives in a burrow on the island. She is very competitive and regularly challenges Oona to races.
Silky (voiced by Laura McCallan) - A grey-coloured seal pup who lives in a nearby lagoon. She joins Oona and Baba on their underwater adventures.
Otto (voiced by Brenn Doherty) - A green owl who normally appears slightly uncoordinated. He is an expert flier and shares flying tips with Oona.
Bernie (voiced by Jim Craig) - An elderly hermit crab who enjoys telling  tales of his youth to Oona and Baba.
Flynne (voiced by Orna Canning) - A fox who does not like to be bothered but has shown from time to time that she has a caring heart.
Spikey - A baby hedgehog who Baba enjoys playing with.
Chloe - A migrating Arctic Tern who visits Puffin Rock during the summer.

Episodes 

The first season began airing on RTÉjr on 12 January 2015. The second season aired in 2016.

Season 1 

Puffin Practice / The Mystery Egg / To See the Moon - Oona tries to teach her brother Baba how to act like a grown-up puffin; Oona, Baba, and Mossy must help an egg find its parents; Oona wants to stay up late to see a super moon.
The Shiny Shell / Friendly Flynne / A Feather Bed - A shell that Baba finds attracts seagulls; Flynne the fox tries to prove that she is nice; Oona and Baba find bedding for the Puffins' burrow.
Beach Rescue / Lost Berries / Night Lights - A baby seagull gets trapped in fishing line; Mossy needs to collect berries for the Shrew Crew; Oona makes a trip to the sea at night.
Pond Life / Bird Detective / Bernie's Shell - Oona has to keep Baba clean; Oona learns about seagulls' behavior; Oona and Silky find Bernie a new shell.
Hop, Skip and Bump / Bouncing Back / A Noisy Neighbor - May teaches Oona how to hop "like the experts"; Oona and Silky have trouble finding a game that they both enjoy; A noisy starling bird keeps Oona awake.
Stormy Weather / Rock Music / Baba's Adventure - During a storm, Oona and Baba are stuck on a cliff; Oona practices singing with her mother; Baba finds his way home, with the help of his friends.
The Burrow Race / Silky's Slide / Ruffled Feathers - Oona and May race each other to discover who is fastest; After a storm, Silky is left stranded at sea; Oona, Baba, and Otto search for a white egret.
Finding Bernie / The Foggy Day / Run, Flap, Fly - Oona and Silky help Bernie get home safely; Mossy and the Shrew Crew help Oona and Baba find their way home in the fog; Oona learns a new skill.
Follow the Puffin / Spot the Puffin / The Sad Whale - Oona is put in charge of the Shrew Crew; Oona feels self-conscious about her multicolored beak; Oona and Silky must find a whale's family.
The Fast Day / Baba's Friend / Flying High - Oona and Baba try to keep up with a speedy moth; Baba befriends a green caterpillar; Oona and Otto practice flying.
Silky's Seahorses / Keeping Cosy / Baba's Picnic - Silky finds seahorses in the rock pool; Mossy learns how to keep warm on a cold day; Baba and Mossy set up a picnic for their friends.
Cave Camping / The Empty Shell / Three's a Crowd - The Puffin family visits an underwater cave; The red crabs are put in danger; Pip feels left out of Baba and Pop's activities.
Mossy Goes Solo / Flooded Burrow / Daytime Sleepover - Mossy leaves the Shrew Crew; The Puffins must stay with May after their burrow floods; Oona and Baba sleep at Otto's home.

Season 2 

Back to the Pond / The Fallen Rocks / Homesick Hoglet - The Puffin family guide a friendly frog to the pond; Oona and her pals help free a trapped Bernie; Baba and baby hedgehog Spiky go exploring.
Silky and the Octopus / The Salmon Leap / The Great Gull - Oona and Silky have an octopus adventure!; Otto tries to get his siblings to fall asleep; Oona and Baba protect a baby seagull from the Great Gull.
Baba-sitting / The Puffin Way / Bernie and the Bee - It's spring and Baba wants to wake Spiky from his winter nap!; Oona learns about the slow and steady "Puffin Way"; Baba and Oona rescue a tired bee.
Find the Owls / Mossy's Flea / Dinner at Bernie's - Otto and the puffins search for the hidden Pip and Pop; Mossy's flea pal Fred peps up a playdate; Oona helps Bernie prepare for a special dinner.
The Dung Beetle / Oona's Fishing Trip / Spot the Ladybird - Oona and Baba help a poop-rolling dung beetle build a nest; On a windy day, Papa and Oona go fishing; Baba, May, and Mossy look for ladybirds.
The Best Shell / The Meteor Shower / The Dragonfly Display - When Baba takes Bernie's favorite shell, Oona helps him return it; The kids enjoy a shooting star show; Baba has a close call during a dragonfly hunt.
Silky's New Friend / The First Snow / Oona's Cave - Silky introduces the gang to her new pal, a clever clam; The kids enjoy their first snowfall; Silky and Mossy help Oona practice burrow building.
Just Like Mama / Diving Deeper / A Day Out - Oona discovers the many ways she's just like Mama; At diving practice, Oona gets a special lesson from Silky; Papa takes the family on a fun day out.
Owl School / A Hot Day / A Summer Visitor - Baba and Oona join Pip and Pop for Otto's "big owl" lessons; On a hot day, Oona worries that Flynne may be in trouble; Oona makes a new forever pal.
Lamb Chase / Mossy Impossible / A Special Seashell - Oona and Baba help a lost lamb; When Oona becomes tangled up in debris, Mossy jumps into action!; Oona looks for shiny shells to cheer up a sick Baba.
Turtle Taxi / New Neighbors / Rainbow - Bernie rides a turtle for a daring sea rescue; The Great Gull steals the seagulls' nests, but clever Oona has a plan; The kids race to catch a rainbow.
Puffin Treasure / Mossy's Mystery / The Longest Day - Mama treats Baba to a treasure hunt; The shrews' berries are under threat, but Mossy is on the case!; The kids gather to watch a special sunrise.
House Hunting / Super Snail / Day and Night - Bernie searches for a new shell for Bernadette; Oona and May help Baba find his snail pal; Can the owls stay awake to watch the solar eclipse?

Accolades

Production
The series was made by Kilkenny-based Cartoon Saloon, the studio behind the Academy Award-nominated feature Song of the Sea.

Film adaptation
In July 2019, Cartoon Saloon announced that a film based on the series was in development.

The films title and cast were revealed on February 13, 2023, the name of the movie was revealed to be Puffin Rock and the New Friends, with Chris O'Dowd reprising his role.

References

External links

Official site on NickJr.co.uk
Official site on Milkshake!

Irish children's animated television series
Animated preschool education television series
2010s preschool education television series
English-language television shows
Irish preschool education television series
2010s animated television series
Television shows set in the Republic of Ireland
2015 Irish television series debuts
Channel 5 (British TV channel) original programming
Animated television series about birds
Animated television series about foxes
Animated television series about rabbits and hares
Animated television series about children